The Ruger Blackhawk is a six-shot, single-action revolver manufactured by Sturm, Ruger & Co. It is produced in a variety of finishes, calibers, and barrel lengths.

History
In the early 1950s, Westerns were popular in movies and television. Colt had discontinued the iconic Single Action Army prior to World War II, and few single-action revolvers were available to meet market demand for cowboy-style revolvers. In 1953, the new firm of Sturm, Ruger & Company introduced the Single-Six, a .22 LR rimfire single-action revolver. The Single-Six proved to be a popular seller, leading Ruger to develop and market a centerfire revolver similar to the Single Action Army: the Ruger Blackhawk. The Ruger Blackhawk was named after the Stutz Blackhawk automobile. 

Ruger introduced the Blackhawk in 1955. Chambered for the .357 Magnum, the Blackhawk was a simple and strong design, and it sold well. In 1956, as Smith & Wesson was introducing the new .44 Magnum, Ruger quickly developed a variant of the Blackhawk in the new cartridge. Ruger achieved wide popularity with this firearm in a hotly anticipated new cartridge, which was both cheaper and more readily available than the Smith & Wesson Model 29 revolver. According to popular legend, Ruger was able to field a .44 Magnum revolver at nearly the same time as Smith & Wesson due to a Ruger employee finding expended .44 Magnum cartridge cases at a scrapyard and deducing that Smith & Wesson was about to launch a new cartridge.

The 1955–1962 Blackhawks are known today as the "Flattop" models, because their adjustable rear sights were not protected by "ears" extending up from the frame as later became standard. From 1962 through 1972, Ruger made the "Three Screw" Blackhawk in various calibers, so called by the number of screws visible on the side of the revolver.

The Flattop and Three Screw Rugers were modernized compared to the Colt Single Action Army, in that they had adjustable sights instead of the Colt's fixed sights, and they used wire coil springs instead of the Colt's flat leaf springs. Bill Ruger chose coil springs due to their greater durability, saying that it solved one of the primary weaknesses of the Colt design.

The early models of the Blackhawk still operated the same way as the Colt, in that the hammer was half-cocked to load and unload and that the firearm was not safe to carry with all six chambers loaded due to the hammer resting upon the sixth chamber. In 1973, in order to eliminate accidents occurring from the hammer jarring against a round loaded in the sixth chamber, Ruger introduced the New Model Blackhawk. The New Model Blackhawk did not require the hammer to be half-cocked for loading and unloading, and it employed a transfer bar mechanism which prevented the cartridge under the hammer from being fired without the trigger being pulled. The New Blackhawk was seen as limiting firearms accidents and legal liability. Ruger then began offering a retrofit program, offering free transfer bar conversions to earlier variants of the Blackhawk.

It is worth noting that the Super Blackhawk is capable of operating with much higher pressure handloads than factory produced ammunition in .44 Magnum. Factory produced loads such as Federal Champion 240 gr JSP loads are right around 800 ft-lbs muzzle energy. Loads in excess of 1200 ft-lbs muzzle energy are commonly produced by handloaders for this caliber and the Super Blackhawk can, in fact, handle more powerful loads than any .44 Magnum lever action rifle and substantially more powerful rounds than any double action .44 Magnum revolver. Buffalo Bore makes a heavy load that is in excess of 1500 ft-lbs muzzle energy.

These facts make the Ruger Super Blackhawk one of the top choices for handgun hunting. It is capable of reliably taking down deer, elk, caribou, moose, lion, grizzly or brown bear and even cape buffalo. It is commonly used to deliver a coup de grace shot to mortally wounded large game, having the ability to dispatch even an elephant with a conscientiously placed close range shot to the head. The wide availability of .44 Magnum cases and bullets make the .44 Magnum chambering far more practical than .454 Casull or .480 Ruger, while allowing for similar ballistics in custom loadings.

The Ruger Super Blackhawk in .44 Magnum is one of the most accurate big bore pistols for target shooting, typically returning 5 shot groups that are one ragged hole from a rest at 25 yards. Work is commonly performed on the action of these revolvers to give a light, crisp trigger pull, thereby contributing to accuracy.

Various models

Over the years the Blackhawk has appeared in a wide variety of models. These models include:
New Model Blackhawk: Produced in blued steel in .30 Carbine, .357 Magnum, .41 Remington Magnum, .44 Special, and .45 Colt; produced in stainless in .327 Federal Magnum with an 8-round cylinder, .357 Magnum, and .45 Colt. Multiple barrel lengths were offered in many of these configurations.
New Model Blackhawk Convertible: The cylinder of a Blackhawk is easily removed, and can be replaced with a cylinder for a different cartridge of the same diameter. Ruger has offered "convertible" cylinder revolvers in .45 Colt/.45 ACP, .38-40/10mm Auto, and .357 Magnum/9×19mm Parabellum. Other than being sold with multiple cylinders, these firearms are identical to the Blackhawk.
New Model Super Blackhawk: Produced in blued and stainless, with or without a rib for mounting a scope. The Super Blackhawk is built on the same frame, but with a larger grip (in the 7.5" and 10.5" barrels) and unfluted cylinder (except for 5.5" barrel), in order to more effectively deal with the .44 Magnum's recoil. Also, the grip frames are made of steel, versus aluminium for those same components in the Blackhawk. Ejector rod housings were originally steel on old model Super Blackhawks. The new model stainless steel versions have steel ejector rod housings.
Vaquero and New Vaquero: With the popularity of Cowboy Action Shooting came demand for a single-action revolver that was more traditional in appearance. As the standard Ruger Blackhawk departs from the Single Action Army looks due to its adjustable sights, Ruger offered a fixed-sight equivalent to cater to buyers wanting a more traditional appearance. In all other ways, the Vaquero was identical to the Blackhawk, though offered in slightly fewer variants. The original Vaquero was offered in .357 Magnum, .44 Magnum, and .45 Colt. After some time, Ruger went with a smaller frame to more closely resemble the actual size of the Colt SAA, changed the name to the New Vaquero, and dropped the powerful .44 Magnum from the lineup. While keeping the smaller size, Ruger later went back to the simple Vaquero name.
Bisley: The Bisley grip is a type of angled grip developed by Colt for target shooting at the end of the 19th century. Ruger's "Bisley" offerings incorporated a Bisley-style grip, hammer spur, and trigger.  The Bisley features a down-turned grip inspired by the old #5 single-action army grip made up for Elmer Keith by gunsmith Harold Croft in 1929, although it is larger in size.  This was in turn inspired by the classic 1894 Colt Bisley revolver, so named after the famous English  shooting range at Bisley which was the site of many notable shooting matches in the late 19th century and is still in regular use. The Ruger Bisley has become a popular platform for conversion to even larger calibers by custom gunsmiths such as Gary Reeder, John Linebaugh, and Hamilton Bowen.
Old Army: The Old Army is a percussion ("cap and ball") black powder revolver based on the Blackhawk frame.

Calibers
.30 Carbine
.32 H&R Magnum/.32-20 Winchester Convertible (Single distributor—discontinued)
.327 Federal Magnum
9×19mm Parabellum/.357 Magnum Convertible
.357 Magnum
.357 Remington Maximum (Discontinued)
10mm Auto/.38-40 Winchester Convertible (Single distributor—discontinued)
10mm Auto/.40 S&W Convertible (Discontinued)
.41 Magnum
.44 Special
.44 Magnum 
.44-40 Winchester
.44 Magnum/.44-40 Winchester Convertible (Single distributor—discontinued)
.45 ACP/.45 Colt Convertible
.45 Colt
.454 Casull (Super Blackhawk Distributor Exclusive)
.480 Ruger  (Super Blackhawk Distributor Exclusive)

Finishes
Blued
Stainless steel

See also
Ruger Single-Six
Table of handgun and rifle cartridges

References

External links
 Ruger New Model Blackhawk on Ruger.com
 New Model Super Blackhawk on Ruger.com
 An Exploded-View Diagram of a Ruger Blackhawk from American Rifleman
 Ruger Bisley on Ruger.com

Ruger revolvers
Single-action revolvers
.327 Federal Magnum firearms
.357 Magnum firearms
.44 Magnum firearms
.45 Colt firearms
.480 Ruger firearms
.454 Casull firearms
.30 Carbine firearms
Weapons and ammunition introduced in 1955